Yosef Taieb (born 15 February 1981) is an Israeli politician. He is currently a member of the Knesset for Shas.

Biography
Taieb was born in the 15th arrondissement of Paris to parents of Tunisian Jewish descent. He emigrated to Israel at the age of 17 to study in the Mir Yeshiva in Jerusalem. During his national service in the Israel Defence Forces, he served in the Givati Brigade. Between 2006 and 2008 he worked in Toulouse as a community rabbi. After returning to Israel, he managed projects for French immigrants run by the Wolfson Foundation from 2009 to 2020.

Taieb was elected to the municipal council of Kiryat Ye'arim. In 2018 he became deputy mayor of the council. He was placed fifteenth on the Shas list for the April 2019 elections, but the party won only eight seats. He was placed twelfth for the September 2019 elections, in which Shas won nine seats. Although he missed out again in the March 2020 elections in which he was placed eleventh and Shas again won nine seats, he entered the Knesset on 1 July 2020 as a replacement for Yoav Ben-Tzur, who had resigned his seat under the Norwegian Law after being appointed to the cabinet. Placed tenth on the Shas list for the March 2021 elections, he lost his seat as the party won nine seats. He regained his seat when Aryeh Deri resigned his own seat under the Norwegian Law; he left the Knesset again when Deri returned to the legislature after losing his ministerial position. When Deri resigned from the Knesset in January 2022, Taieb returned for a third spell.

References

External links

1981 births
Living people
French emigrants to Israel
21st-century French rabbis
French Orthodox rabbis
Clergy from Toulouse
Israeli Orthodox rabbis
Israeli people of French-Jewish descent
Jewish Israeli politicians
Members of the 23rd Knesset (2020–2021)
Members of the 24th Knesset (2021–2022)
Members of the 25th Knesset (2022–)
Politicians from Paris
Rabbinic members of the Knesset
Shas politicians